The Literary Calavera or calavera literaria (Spanish: literary skull) is a traditional Mexican literary form: a satirical or light-hearted writing in verse, often composed for the Day of the Dead.

History 

Initially known as panteones, these verses had their origin in the 19th century as mocking epitaph and a way of expressing ideas or feelings that in other occasions might be difficult to express. For this reason they were often censored or destroyed, since they also often served as a means to express political satire. The first calaveras were published in 1879, in the newspaper El Socialista, of Guadalajara.

Features 
They are irreverent verses, written as epitaphs, portraying people as if they were dead.
They are used to channel feelings that in another context would be difficult to express.
They are usually accompanied by drawings of skulls.
They are traditional Mexican compositions.

References 

Mexican literature
Day of the Dead
Acknowledgements of death